Triathlon has been a sport of  the Pan American Games since the 1995 games.

Men's competition

Women's competition

Mixed competition

Medal table

Nations
The following nations have taken part in the triathlon competition.

References

 
Sports at the Pan American Games
Pan American Games
Pan American Games
Pan American Games